Wilson Township may refer to several places in the U.S. state of Kansas:

 Wilson Township, Ellsworth County, Kansas
 Wilson Township, Lane County, Kansas
 Wilson Township, Marion County, Kansas
 Wilson Township, Rice County, Kansas

See also

 Wilson Township (disambiguation)

Kansas township disambiguation pages